Princesse (French 'princess') may refer to:

"Princesse", single hit for Julie Zenatti
Princesse (Nekfeu song)
La Princesse 15-metre (50-foot) mechanical spider designed and operated by French performance art company La Machine.

See also
Princess (disambiguation)